Gonna Let It Shine: A Concert for the Holidays (or simply Gonna Let It Shine), is a live album by American folk singer Odetta, released in 2005. It was recorded at Fordham University in New York City for a public radio broadcast.

Gonna Let It Shine was nominated for a Grammy Award for Best Traditional Blues Album.  It was the last album of new material that Odetta would release during her lifetime.

Track listing
All songs Traditional unless otherwise noted.
"Intro" – 3:42
"This Little Light of Mine" (Harry Loes) – 5:43
"Rise Up Shepherd" – 3:22
"Mary Had a Baby" – 2:33
"What Month Was Jesus Born In?" – 1:46
"Shout for Joy" – 2:20
"Virgin Mary Had One Son" – 3:17
"Down by the Riverside" – 4:06
"Poor Little Jesus" – 2:15
"Freedom Trilogy: Oh Freedom/Come & Go with Me/I'm on My Way" – 6:32
"Somebody Talking 'Bout Jesus" – 1:40
"Keep on Movin' It On" (Odetta Gordon) – 2:02
"O Jerusalem" (Athena, Faro, Traditional) – 3:33
"If Anybody Asks You" (Gordon) – 5:22
"Midnight Special" (Huddie Ledbetter) – 4:54
"This Little Light of Mine" – 4:41

Personnel
Odetta – vocals
Seth Farber – piano
The Holmes Brothers – background vocals

Production notes
Engineered by Fred Guarino
Liner notes by Bernice Johnson Reagon and Odetta
Executive producers – Catherine and Mark Carpentieri

References

Odetta live albums
2005 live albums